Panshanger was a large country house located between the outer edge of Hertford and Welwyn Garden City in Hertfordshire, England.

History

Earl Cowper, who later became Lord Chancellor of Great Britain, acquired the Cole Green estate c. 1700. He remodelled the estate in 1704 and made alterations to the house in 1711. The 5th Earl Cowper commissioned Samuel Wyatt and then William Atkinson to design a new house in a slightly different location in Regency-Gothic style; construction work started on site in 1806. The park was landscaped with advice from Humphry Repton, starting in 1799. Following the death of the 7th Earl Cowper in 1905, the estate was inherited by Ethel Grenfell, Baroness Desborough and, after she died in 1952 with no heir, the estate was sold in lots by auction the following year, but there was no interest in the house itself and it was demolished between 1953 and 1954. A large portion of the outlying farms forming part of the estate had been sold by auction on 30 May 1919.

The park contains the largest maiden (not pollarded) oak in the country, with a circumference of 7.6 metres. It is believed to have been planted by Queen Elizabeth I. Acorns from the tree have been used as seedlings for notable oaks in other parts of the country, such as the Prince Consort Oak in the Forest of Dean. Winston Churchill planted a sapling from the tree in the park and the tree can still be seen in the grounds.

Panshanger Park and nature reserve

Panshanger Park is owned by Tarmac which extracts sand and gravel from the site. Although Panshanger House was demolished, the orangery, nursery garden wall, stables, and a number of cottages and estate buildings remain, all of which are listed by English Heritage.

The eastern end has been open since 31 March 2014 as a 1,000 acre country park and nature reserve - with 200 acres open to the public. The park consists of wetlands, grasslands and reedbeds which serve as a home for a wide variety of damselfly and dragonfly species. The park is also home to kingfishers, waterfowl and osprey. The rest of the site will be opened as gravel extraction is completed.

Panshanger district
The Panshanger district of Welwyn Garden City, and the nearby Panshanger Aerodrome, are named after the Panshanger estate.  However, Panshanger Park does not lie within the Panshanger ward of Welwyn Garden City, nor indeed any part of Welwyn Garden City.  It actually lies within the parishes of Hertford and Hertingfordbury.

References

Sources
Robinson, John, Felling the Ancient Oaks, Aurum Press, 2011, 

Country houses in Hertfordshire
British country houses destroyed in the 20th century
East Hertfordshire District
Grade II* listed parks and gardens in Hertfordshire
Gardens by Humphry Repton
Gardens by Capability Brown